Chimoré is a village in Santa Cruz Department, Bolivia.

References

Populated places in Santa Cruz Department (Bolivia)